Anyone's Legend (AL), previously known as Rogue Warriors (RW), is a Chinese professional League of Legends team competing in the LPL, the top-level league for the game in China.

History 
ASUS ROG established the team under the name Rogue Warriors on 15 December 2017. Its inaugural roster consisted of Mouse, Flawless, Doinb, Smlz, and killua.

On 24 March 2020, jungler WeiYan was kicked from Rogue Warriors after an internal investigation determined he was involved in attempted match fixing. The organization was subsequently fined CN¥3 million (≈US$423,687.50 at the time) by Riot Games for initially covering up for WeiYan.

Roster

Tournament results

References

External links 
 

2017 establishments in China
Esports teams established in 2017
Esports teams based in China
League of Legends Pro League teams